Belgica is a flightless midge genus in the family Chironomidae. It contains the following two species:

 Belgica albipes , found in the Crozet Islands (Îles Crozet) in the southern Indian Ocean
 Belgica antarctica , found in the maritime Antarctic

References

Further reading
 

 
Insects of Antarctica
Taxa named by Jean-Charles Jacobs